Akeli is a 2014 Hindi film produced, written and directed by Vinod Pande. The film featured R. Madhavan in his first full-length role in a Hindi film, alongside danseuse Nandini Ghosal and Anupam Shyam. Despite being completed and censored in August 1999, the film remained unreleased before the makers chose to release it via YouTube in August 2014.

Cast

 R. Madhavan as Avinash
 Nandini Ghoshal as Meera
 Anupam Shyam as MLA Pathare
 Sujata Sanghamitra as Rosie
 Prerna Agarwal as Ameeta
 Asha Sharma as Meera's mother
 Aashish Kaul as Rohit
 Raj Kiran as Avinash's first boss
 Vinod Pande as Avinash's boss
 Brij Gopal as Railway constable
 Shakti Singh as Pawar 
 Abha Parmar as Meera's sister-in-law
 Chandra Mohan as Meera's brother
 Vipin Kansal as Ravi
 Rakesh Shrivastava as Mishraji
 Jharna Dave as Pratibha
 Kailash Kaushik as D K
 Raj Joshi as Rohit's father
 Suman Pednekar as Laxmibai, Meera's maid
 Chaitanya as Ranjan
 Samina as Rajjo
 Ritwika Dey as Guesthouse landlady
 Sheela Mishra as Rohit's mother
 Murali Sharma as Meera's boss
 Shahnaaz Dhillon as woman outside telephone booth
 Ramprakash Arora as Rohit's uncle
 Sunil Kumar Singh as pandit in wedding
 Nimai Das as Pathare's driver
 Snehal Vilankar as receptionist
 Tanvir Siddique as Damle

Production
The project materialised in late 1997, with R. Madhavan agreeing to make his acting debut in Hindi films with the project. He signed the film while he was shooting for the Kannada venture, Shanti Shanti Shanti (1998), as well as a series of television dramas. Danceuse Nandini Gopal was selected to play the leading female role, while Anupam Shyam was picked to play another supporting role. The film was censored on 10 August 1999, but was unable to find a distributor for a theatrical release. In 2000, a corporate group considered purchasing the first copy of the film, but Vinod Pande decided to delay the venture until Madhavan's Rehnaa Hai Terre Dil Mein (2001) was released. The film then geared up for release in 2002 through Yash Raj Films, but plans were suddenly cancelled at the final moment and the project remained indefinitely on hold.

Release
In 2014, Vinod Pande chose to release the film directly on to YouTube citing he did not want the film to get "lost", and that another of his unreleased films, Chaloo Movie, had found itself online illegally. It was later played at the Festival du Film d'Asie du Sud Transgressif in France in February 2015, with Vinod Pande in attendance.

References

External links
 

2010s Hindi-language films
2014 films
2010s rediscovered films
Rediscovered Indian films